The 2000 European Road Championships were held in Kielce, Poland, between 3 August and 5 August 2000. Regulated by the European Cycling Union. The event consisted of a road race and a time trial for men and women under-23.

Schedule

Individual time trial 
Friday 3 August 2000
 Women under-23
 Men under-23

Road race
Sunday 5 August 2000
 Women under-23
 Men under-23

Events summary

Medal table

References

External links
The European Cycling Union

European Road Championships, 2000
Road cycling
European Road Championships by year
Cycling
Sport in Kielce
European Road Championships